Gregorio Urbano Gilbert Suero (Puerto Plata, 25 May 1898 – Santo Domingo, 29 November 1970) was a Dominican Republic linotypist and guerrilla fighter. 

Gilbert’s parents were Narcisa Suero and the Bahamian immigrant Benjamin Gilbert. He became orphan at a young age and his eldest siblings raised him. In 1916, Gilbert settled in San Pedro de Macorís where he worked as a linotypist, and as a salesclerk in a grocery store. 

On 10 January 1917, U. S. marines were invading the port city, and Gilbert decided to fight against them, he charged a revolver and shot against the marines, killing officer C. H. Burton in the firefight. He joined the guerrilla against the United States occupation; he was captured and sentenced to death. His sentence was commuted to life imprisonment, but he was released on 22 October 1922; Gilbert went to the exile in Cuba, Curaçao, and Nicaragua. In Nicaragua, he joined Sandino’s rebellion against the United States occupation of that country. 

In 1929 he returned to the Dominican Republic. Gilbert was also part of the 1965 April Revolution and fight against the second United States occupation of the Dominican Republic (1965–66). In 1970 Gilbert wrote his memoir and died shortly afterwards.

A metro station in Santo Domingo is named in honor of Gilbert.

References 

1898 births
1970 deaths
Dominican Republic people of Bahamian descent
People from Puerto Plata, Dominican Republic
People of the Banana Wars